Hong Kong Internet eXchange (HKIX) is an internet exchange point in Hong Kong. The cooperative project is initiated by the Information Technology Services Centre (ITSC) of the Chinese University of Hong Kong (CUHK) providing the service free of charge. It is now operated by HKIX Limited, a wholly owned subsidiary of the CUHK Foundation.

The aim of the HKIX is to connect Internet service providers (ISPs) in Hong Kong so that intra-Hong Kong traffic can be exchanged locally without routing through the US or other countries. 99% internet interaction in Hong Kong goes through the centre, and HKIX acts as Hong Kong's network backbone. According to Cloudflare, HKIX is the largest internet exchange point in Asia.

History
HKIX was founded in April 1995 by the Chinese University of Hong Kong. It reduced Hong Kong's reliance on US web servers and therefore made internet performance in Hong Kong faster.

In 2004, the HKIX2 back-up mirror site was created, which is located at CITIC Telecom Tower.

In 2009, HKIX announced their collaboration with Cisco Systems to deploy the Nexus 7000 series switch technology, marking HKIX the first among the world's leading internet exchanges.

As of 2013 the exchange handles 280 gigabits of information per second during its peak times every day. Chinese University stated that the amount of information is equivalent to 17,000 five megapixel photographs. In 2013, Edward Snowden said that the National Security Agency gained access to the backbone and took data from it. Chinese University said that it did not find evidence of hacking.

In February 2017, it was announced that 3 more sites were launched in data centres located in Fo Tan and Tseung Kwan O.

June 2020, HKIX added support for RPKI in order to enhance the security of HKIX routing.

Background 

The concept of an "Internet Exchange" is very important after the NSFNet Backbone faded away because IAPs had to be interconnected to maintain full connectivity to the entire Internet. 

In Hong Kong, the situation is a little bit different. Many of the IAPs in Hong Kong have their own links to the US. They have to connect to each other locally only to have faster and less expensive access to local sites. In addition, there are some commercial Internet Exchanges in Hong Kong for routing traffic within the city.

Facilities

Core sites 
The HKIX1 is located on the Sha Tin campus of Chinese University. The door of the building that houses it has no sign. Danny Lee of the South China Morning Post said that the building that houses it is a "grey, bunker-like structure could easily pass for any other building" at the university.

HKIX1b is an extension to HKIX1, and is interconnected with HKIX1 by multiple 100 Gbit/s links. The data center is close to University station, and is less than 2 km from HKIX1 (fiber distance). The main purpose of establishing HKIX1b is to offer dual-core for high availability and for supporting more port connections.

Satellite sites 

HKIX2 is located inside the CITIC Telecom Tower, and is connected to HKIX1 via two 10Gbit/s links.

Members 
As of June 2018, there are 283 connected ASN to the HKIX. The following are some of the major participants with 100G speed: 

 Amazon
 Akamai
 China Mobile
 CloudFlare
 Facebook
 Google
 Hong Kong Broadband Network
 Tencent
 TVB
 Yahoo

See also 
 List of Internet exchange points

References

External links

Official website

HKIX
Internet in Hong Kong
Chinese University of Hong Kong
Internet exchange points in Asia